Lai Li-chin (born 15 August 1988) is a Taiwanese footballer who plays as a forward for Taiwan Mulan Football League club Taichung Blue Whale. She has been a member of the Chinese Taipei women's national team.

International goals

References

1988 births
Living people
Women's association football forwards
Taiwanese women's footballers
People from Hualien County
Chinese Taipei women's international footballers
Asian Games competitors for Chinese Taipei
Footballers at the 2014 Asian Games
Footballers at the 2018 Asian Games